The Métis flag was first used by Métis resistance fighters in Rupert's Land before the 1816 Battle of Seven Oaks. According to only one contemporary account, the flag was "said to be" a gift from  the North West Company in 1815, but no other surviving accounts confirm this. Both the red and blue versions of the flag have been used to represent the political and military force of the Métis since that time. The Métis flag predates the Flag of Canada by at least 150 years, and is the oldest patriotic flag that is indigenous to Canada.

The blue background flag has been accepted by the Métis National Council as the official flag of the Métis Nation. In 2013, the Métis National Council secured an official mark for the flag to protect it as a symbol of the Métis Nation, and ensure its collective ownership by citizens of the Métis Nation.

Design and symbolism 
The flag shows a white infinity symbol on a field of either blue or red. There are many interpretations of what the colours and symbol mean.

Several origins and meanings have been suggested for the infinity symbol flag:

 The faith that Métis culture shall live on forever, and the mixing of the European immigrants and the First Nations peoples, with the two conjoined circles symbolizing the unity of two cultures. 
 Another possible interpretation of the infinity symbol is that it relates to traditional Métis dances, such as the quadrille, in which dancers move in a figure-eight pattern. 
 There might also be a connection to Celtic knotwork and Scottish influences that include Celtic knots, figure of eight in Scottish country dance, jewellery, etc.
 Others have suggested that the symbol is derived from the Plains First Nations Sign Language for Métis (reported as the symbol for "cart" combined with the symbol for "Man" in reference to the Métis' use of the Red River cart), with the symbol for cart being formed by joining the thumb and forefingers on each hand with the hands held together to form two circles.

There is debate about the historical interpretations of the colours of the Métis flags. 

 Some claim that the red background represents the colours of the Hudson's Bay Company and that the blue background represents the North West Company, (though both the Hudson's Bay Company and the North West Company flew red flags that were a modification of the Red Ensign). 
 Others argue that the blue flag represents the francophone Métis and the red flag represents the anglophone Métis.
 Still others argue that the blue and white combination is based on both the Flag of Scotland, and the traditional colours of Quebec. 
 And yet others have said that the red flag is for Manitoba and the Northwest Territory Métis, and the blue is for the Saskatchewan Métis (despite the first recorded sighting of the red flag in what is now Saskatchewan and the blue flag first being recorded in what is now Manitoba).
 Another explanation for the colours of the flags is that they depend on how the flag is being used. Some argue that the red flag is the Métis Hunting Flag, letting the people around know that they were a hunting party and not a group going to war, and the guide for the day would be the flag-bearer. Due to the potential for skirmishes and battles on the bison hunting trips, such as the Battle of Grand Coteau, the red flag could serve as a standard.
 Some have also suggested that the flag started out as someone's attempt to design a flag for the Métis, and was putting out feelers to trial a design, which is why there are both red and blue flags with the common feature being the white infinity symbol.

The difficulty in knowing the accurate history of the origin of the flag and potential interpretations of the symbolism is that there are no known records that accurately describe the origin of the flag in a first-hand account nor other written records of its creation.

Alternative hypothesis on the colours of the flag 

Prominent Métis lawyer, historian, and author Jean Teillet argues that the story of the origin of the Métis flag is an urban myth. Of the first three historic accounts of the Métis flag, only James Sutherland attributed the flag as a gift from the North West Company, based on rumours that he was told, and she argues for an exercise of caution in taking it as fact. Teillet argues that the Métis had a more active role in the origin of the flag, rather than being passive recipients of the flag or being manipulated by the North West Company.

In 1815, popular fabrics in tradings posts that were available were calico, corduroy, plaid, and stroud. Stroud, a woollen, felt-like, broadcloth commonly used in making coats, was the only suitable material available for making flags. The common colours that were available at the time were green, red, and blue. Telliet asserts that as a matter of practicality, the Métis would have used the material that was available to them for making flags. When they needed to make a new flag, they purchased the material that was available, and if red was not available, they might have chosen to use blue instead. Rather than being a strategic ideological decision to align colours with particular trading companies, her assertion is that the colour was a reaction to what was practical in that time and location.

History 
Originally, the flags that would have been flown in Rupert's Land and across the North-Western Territory were of the Hudson's Bay Company 
flag and North West Company flag, respectively, and the Union Jack.

Métis oral tradition tells that the Métis developed the infinity flag for themselves, and called the flag Li Paviiyoon di Michif in the Michif language. Some people tell a story that Alexander Macdonell of Greenfield gifted the Métis employed by the North West Company a flag in 1814, helping to create the Métis Nation, but there are no records that directly confirm this version of events, and some that potentially contradict this story.

James Sutherland's accounts of the Métis flag
The flag was first reported by James Sutherland in 1815 as red with an infinity symbol, and that it was being flown by Cuthbert Grant at Fort John in the Qu'Appelle area when a Hudson's Bay Company crew were rebuilding Fort Qu'Appelle (not to be confused with Fort Qu'Appelle, Saskatchewan built in 1864). In his account, Sutherland reported a rumour that he had heard about the origin of the flag as a gift from the North West Company given in early 1815, but provided no evidence to confirm this origin story for the flag nor did he state that it was a gift from Alexander Macdonell of Greenfield. The events reported in this account happened prior to Sutherland's arrival at Qu'Appelle on December 8, 1815, so were conveyed to him by Hudson's Bay Company Officer John Richards McKay and his party, who had arrived there in early October 1815 and had witnessed the events described.

Sutherland would also describe his first time seeing the flag at the arrival of John McDonald from Swan River in early 1816, though he did not provide an additional description of the flag.

Sutherland also discussed what he had been told about why the flag was flying.

Sutherland's account of these events was written sometime after the events and based on his memory, as he had destroyed his papers to prevent them from being taken by the North West Company.

Potential contradictions of James Sutherland's account of the Métis flag as a gift
However, the assertion that the flag was a gift for the Métis from Alexander Macdonell of Greenfield and the North West Company is potentially contradicted by other accounts of gifts being given to the Métis by the North West Company and people they employed, in which the accounts do not mention of the flag among other gifts being given.

A potential contradiction of Sutherland's suggestion that the flag may have been a gift is found in an account of gifts being given to the Métis by the North West Company on June 28, 1815 at Fort William. The gifts, which included two swords, were given for the actions of the Métis against the Red River Colony, but there is no mention of a flag being gifted to the Métis.

Colin Robertson (then employed by the Hudson's Bay Company) describes gifts being given to the Métis at Fort Gibraltar in his journal entry from September 15, 1815 at Fort Douglas, but there is no mention of a flag being given by Macdonnell among the other presents given by Duncan Cameron to the Métis for their activity against the Colony in Spring 1815 (Macdonell and Cameron had arrived at Fort Gibraltar on two days before on September 13, 1815).

Robertson also recorded details reported to him of a speech and gifts by Cameron upon Cameron's arrival in the Fall of 1814, and the gifts did not include a flag.

Further to potential contradictions of Sutherland's account of the flag being a gift is a dismissal of rumours about Duncan Cameron's gifts to the Métis and the use of the Métis as a militia of the North West Company that was written by Alexander Macdonell of Greenfield in his book A Narrative of Transactions in the Red River Country in 1819. In this book, Macdonell does not mention himself or others gifting a flag to the Métis.

Macdonell also mentioned a general meeting that occurred at Fort William in 1815, but again he did not discuss a flag being given to the Métis.

Peter Fidler's accounts of the Métis flag
Peter Fidler first reported a red Métis flag with an infinity symbol around March 12, 1816 on the Qu'Appelle River, and said that it had been see the previous fall, which corroborated Sutherland's account of John McDonald's visit to Qu'Appelle. Fidler reported a rumour that he had heard that the North West Company was trying to direct the Métis to action against the Hudson's Bay Company and the newly established Red River Colony (the support was not unanimous among the Métis), but he did not attribute the flag to being a gift to the Métis.

On June 1, 1816, Peter Fidler recorded in his Brandon House Journal that the Métis, under the leadership of Cuthbert Grant, were flying the blue flag with an infinity symbol when they attacked the Hudson's Bay Company's Brandon House, mere weeks before the Battle of Seven Oaks that happened on June 19, 1816. The reason for the change in the colour of the flag is not known, and Fidler did not provide information about the origin of the flag. In his narrative of the events to Lord Selkirk, Fidler did not report the changed colour, stating only that the flag was present.

Other flags used by the Métis

Legislative Assembly of Assiniboia 
The provisional government, the Legislative Assembly of Assiniboia, established by the Métis under Louis Riel on December 8, 1869, flew a flag. There are numerous descriptions of the flag that was flown by the provisional government:
 A fleur-de-lis and shamrock on a white background
 A golden fleur-de-lis on a white background
 A golden fleur-de-lis with a black border on a white background
 A fleur-de-lis, shamrock, and small bison on the fly on a white background
 Three fleur-de-lis across the top and a shamrock in the centre of the bottom edge on a white background 
 A fleur-de-lis and a shamrock with a large bison on the lower part on a white background
 A fleur-de-lis with a small bison in one corner on a white background
 A blue fleur-de-lis with a green harp and shamrock on a white background with a gold border
 Three crosses: a large scarlet-coloured cross in the centre, flanked by two smaller gold crosses; on a white background with a gold border
 Fleur-de-lis and shamrocks arranged around a bison on a white background.

Provisional government of Saskatchewan 
The provisional government established by Louis Riel at Batoche on March 19, 1885. A flag of the provisional government is not known, but a Métis Battle Standard was used at the Battle of Batoche. The flag was described as being a blue background, with a wolf's head and hand (palm outward) in the middle, and a banner with the Michif words "" (literally translated, this means "homes, altars, above all liberty").

See also 

Métis buffalo hunt
Métis in Canada
Métis in the United States
Métis in Manitoba

References 

1815 establishments in Canada
Métis in Canada
Flags of Canada
Native American flags
Red and white flags
Métis